Glaisher is a surname, and may refer to:

Cecilia Glaisher (1828–1892), photographer and illustrator
James Glaisher (1809–1903), English meteorologist and astronomer
James Whitbread Lee Glaisher (1848–1928), English mathematician and astronomer

See also
Glaisher (crater), a crater on the moon, named for James Glaisher (1809–1903)
Glacier (disambiguation)